Scarites subterraneus, known generally as the big-headed ground beetle or pedunculate ground beetle, is a species of ground beetle in the family Carabidae. It is found in the Caribbean, Central America, and North America.

References

Further reading

External links

 

Scarites
Beetles of Central America
Beetles of North America
Beetles described in 1775
Taxa named by Johan Christian Fabricius
Articles created by Qbugbot